Lac Sauvage is a freshwater lake in the Mont-Blanc municipality of Quebec, Canada.

A sealed road circumnavigates all but the Western shore of the lake, serving the cottages of the local residents. Powered craft such as motorboats have been forbidden since 1990.

See also 
 List of lakes of Quebec

References

External links 
 Association pour la protection de l'environnement du Lac Sauvage (APELS) [Association for the environmental protection of Lac Sauvage - english version]

Sauvage